Ahu or AHU may refer to:

Polynesian religion
Ahu or a'u - the central stone of a Polynesian marae
Ahu (Easter Island), stone platforms for moai
Ahu, altars in heiau (Hawaiian Temples)

Places
Ahu, Ardabil, a village in Iran
Ahu, Markazi, a village in Iran
Ahu Qaleh
Ahu Tappeh
AHU, IATA code for Cherif Al Idrissi Airport, Al Hoceima, Morocco

People
Ahu Antmen (born 1971), Turkish professor
Ahu Tuğba (born 1955), Turkish actress
Te Ahu Davis (born 1985), New Zealand cricketer
Ahu-toru, Tahitian who travelled with du Fresne
Ahu Türkpençe (born 1977), Turkish actress

Other uses
Air handler, a common part of HVAC systems